The 1917 Iowa State Cyclones football team represented Iowa State College of Agricultural and Mechanic Arts (later renamed Iowa State University) in the Missouri Valley Conference during the 1917 college football season. In their third season under head coach Charles Mayser, the Cyclones compiled a 5–2 record (3–1 against conference opponents), finished in third place in the conference, shut out four of seven opponents, and outscored opponents by a combined total of 129 to 20. They played their home games at State Field in Ames, Iowa. Howard Aldrich was the team captain.

Schedule

References

Iowa State
Iowa State Cyclones football seasons
Iowa State Cyclones football